The 1984 NCAA Skiing Championships were contested at the Wildcat Mountain Ski Area in Jackson, New Hampshire as part of the 31st annual NCAA-sanctioned ski tournament to determine the individual and team national champions of men's and women's collegiate slalom skiing and cross-country skiing in the United States.

Defending champions Utah, coached by Phil Miller, claimed their third team national championship, 66.5 points ahead of Vermont in the cumulative team standings.

Venue

This year's NCAA skiing championships were hosted at the Wildcat Mountain Ski Area near Jackson, New Hampshire.

These were the fifth championships held in the state of New Hampshire (1958, 1964, 1970, 1978, and 1984).

Team scoring

See also
List of NCAA skiing programs

References

1984 in sports in New Hampshire
NCAA Skiing Championships
NCAA Skiing Championships
1984 in alpine skiing
1984 in cross-country skiing